This is a list of music videos by Canadian singer Shania Twain. It contains all 38 music videos, with their respective directors, filming locations, release dates and alternate versions for each video. 

Billboard listed Twain as the "13th Best Music Video Female Artist of all time (42nd overall)". Her music video also became an inspiration to some of her contemporaries and newer pop artists like Halsey and Harry Styles to name a few.

With the exception of "When", which was released exclusively to the United Kingdom, all of the videos released from the albums Shania Twain (1993), The Woman in Me (1995) and Come On Over (1997) are available on Twain's DVD The Platinum Collection. Videos from the albums Up! (2002) and Greatest Hits (2004) are available on select enhanced CD singles and a special DVD-Audio version of Up!. Videos from the album Now (2017) are commercially unavailable. Many of Twain's music videos have  won various awards.

Music videos

Video albums

References

CMT.com Shania Twain

Twain, Shania
Videography